Somerset Lowry-Corry, 2nd Earl Belmore
 Somerset Lowry-Corry, 4th Earl Belmore